"Credimi ancora" (Italian for "Believe me again") is a single by Italian singer Marco Mengoni. The song was released as the lead single from his second studio EP Re matto on 17 February 2010. It was written by Marco Mengoni, Stella Fabiani, Piero Calabrese and Massimo Calabrese. The song peaked to number 3 on the Italian Singles Chart. It was also certified platinum by the Federation of the Italian Music Industry for domestic downloads exceeding 30,000 units.

Music video
A music video to accompany the release of "Credimi ancora" was first released onto YouTube on 18 March 2011 at a total length of three minutes and twenty-eight seconds.
The video was directed by Gaetano Morbioli.

Track listing

Chart performance

Release history

References

2010 singles
Marco Mengoni songs
Sanremo Music Festival songs
2010 songs
Songs written by Marco Mengoni
Sony Music singles